Cantharis nigricans is a species of soldier beetles native to Europe.

References

Cantharidae
Beetles described in 1776
Beetles of Europe
Taxa named by Otto Friedrich Müller